Lawrence Eugene Marks (December 20, 1902 – January 19, 1974) was a player in the National Football League.

Biography
Lawrence Marks was born in Jalapa, Indiana on December 20, 1902 to Carrie Mable (Albright) [1883-1954] and Eugene Oscar Marks [1876-1942]. Soon after, the family moved to Wabash. Lawrence had one brother, Robert Jerald Marks [1907-1993] and one sister, Pauline Marks [1912-1987].  In 1929 he married a concert pianist named Margaret "Marna" Knudson. They lived in Kalamazoo, Michigan. Margaret may have moved to Santa Clara, California after her husband died on January 19, 1974. Lawrence and Margaret had two children, Peggy and Larry.

Career

Lawrence Marks played for the New York (football) Yankees in 1926 and 1927, which featured Red Grange.  The New York Yankees were part of the American Football League in 1926.  The team merged with the National Football League in 1927 and folded after the 1929 season.  The team played their home games at Yankee Stadium.  In 1928 Lawrence Marks played for the Green Bay Packers who was coached by Earl Louis "Curly" Lambeau.

See also
List of New York Yankees (NFL) players
List of Green Bay Packers players

References

External links

1902 births
1974 deaths
People from Wabash, Indiana
New York Yankees (NFL) players
Green Bay Packers players
Indiana Hoosiers football players